Fara Warner is an American author, journalist and speaker known for her reporting on marketing and consumer trends. Warner has held executive positions at Dow Jones & Company and The Wall Street Journal where she was celebrated for her role in creating branded content and revenue opportunities. She is the co-founder of A Picture's Worth, a journalism start-up and a leadership ambassador with Take The Lead, a nonprofit concerned with women's advancement.

Early life 
Warner attended the University of Utah, where she was on staff at The Daily Utah Chronicle, the independent student paper, from 1984 to 1988. Warner earned a master's degree in journalism at Columbia University in New York.

Career 

In her early career, Warner was a freelance journalist who contributed to Mother Jones, The New York Times, and The Daily Beast. She was the Communications Manager of Ford Motor Company in 2002.

Warner was the editorial director of AOL Tech and This Built America, which featured companies in each of the United States over 50 weeks. At The Wall Street Journal, Warner was Global Content Director where she won the Cannes Lion for the Cocainenomics branded content series she developed to help promote the first season of Narcos on Netflix. While Vice President, Custom Content, at Dow Jones, The Drum included Warner on its list of "the world's most creative women."

Warner was a featured speaker for the second annual Women in Business Luncheon on December 5, 2006 and was on the board of G23, the Omnicorp Group consultancy group for reaching women consumers. She was also a Howard R Marsh Visiting Professor of Journalism and Professor of Communication Studies at the University of Michigan. In 2011, Warner was the keynote speaker for the Purse Power seminar which took place at the Mansion House in Dublin, Ireland. In 2016, Warner was a judge for the  Craig Newmark Graduate School of Journalism and City College of New York’s Branded and Integrated Communication Program “Journalism in the Age of Branded Content...and Vice Versa” event.

Warner and Elissa Yancey led the 2018-2019 Poynter College Media Project at the Poynter Institute, which provided free newsroom training and online seminars for nine student media organizations. Warner was also an industry expert trainer in 2019 for the Take The Lead “50 Women Can Change the World in Journalism” program.

Warner's book, "The Power of the Purse: How Smart Businesses Are Adapting to the World’s Most Important Consumers - Women,” was published in 2005 by FT Press and chronicled the power of women in business.

References 

American women journalists
20th-century American women writers
21st-century American women writers
Living people
Year of birth missing (living people)
Created via preloaddraft